Nicholas William Leeson (born 25 February 1967) is an English former derivatives trader whose fraudulent, unauthorized and speculative trades resulted in the 1995 collapse of Barings Bank, the United Kingdom's oldest merchant bank. Leeson was convicted of financial crime in a Singapore court and served over four years in Changi Prison.

Between 2005 and 2011, Leeson had senior management roles at League of Ireland club Galway United. After it suffered financial difficulties, he resigned from his position as chief executive officer. He is also active on the keynote and after-dinner speaking circuit, where he advises companies about risk and corporate responsibility.

Early life
Nick Leeson was born in Watford, Hertfordshire, and attended Parmiter's School in nearby Garston. Born to working-class parents on a council estate, his father was a self-employed plasterer, his mother a nurse. After finishing sixth form in 1985 with six O Levels and two A level passes in English Literature and History with C and D grades respectively, failing his third subject, Mathematics, he was hired as a clerk with the Lombard Street branch of the Coutts private bank, where he settled paper cheques, crediting and debiting client accounts.

In 1987, Leeson moved to Morgan Stanley's Futures and Options back office, clearing and settling listed derivatives transactions. With few prospects for a front office role, he joined Barings Bank two years later, at £12,000 a year. With four other settlement specialists, he was briefly seconded to Hong Kong to troubleshoot Barings' back office in the Indonesian capital of Jakarta. He returned to London in September 1991 to investigate a case of fraud in which a Barings employee had used a client's account to trade on a proprietary basis until margin calls from the clearinghouses unraveled the scheme.

Career
In April 1992, Barings decided to open a Futures and Options office in Singapore, executing and clearing transactions on the Singapore International Monetary Exchange (SIMEX). Barings had held a seat on SIMEX for some time, but did not activate it until Leeson, appointed general manager, was sent over to head both front office and back office operations. Prior to leaving, Leeson was denied a broker's licence in the UK because of committing fraud on his application. He had failed to report a judgment against him entered by the National Westminster Bank. Neither Leeson nor Barings disclosed this denial when he applied for his licence in Singapore.

From 1992, Leeson made unauthorised speculative trades that at first made large profits for Barings: £10 million, which accounted for 10% of Barings' annual profit. He earned a bonus of £130,000 on his salary of £50,000 for that year. Leeson's luck soon went sour and he used one of Barings' error accounts (accounts used to correct mistakes made in trading) to hide his losses. He says that this account was first used to hide an error made by one of his subordinates; she had been assigned to buy twenty futures contracts for Fuji Bank, but had sold them instead, costing Barings £20,000.

However, Leeson used this error account to cover further bad trades by himself and others. For example, he used it to cover a number of mistakes made by one of his traders who frequently came to work after long nights of partying. Leeson believes that he first crossed into out-and-out criminal conduct when he forgot to reconcile a discrepancy of 500 contracts, costing Barings US$1.7 million. He concluded that the only way to hide such a massive error and keep his job was to hide it in the error account. Leeson insists that he never used the account for his own gain, but in 1996 investigators had located approximately $35 million in various bank accounts tied to him.

Downfall and imprisonment
By the end of 1992, the error account's losses exceeded £2 million, increasing to £23 million in late 1993. This amount ballooned to £208 million by the end of 1994. Leeson had followed a "doubling" strategy: every time he lost money, he would bet double the amount that was lost in order to recoup the amount. This had been successful for him in the past, including once in 1993 where he was able to cover a £6 million negative balance in the error account and after which he vowed not to use the account again. However, Leeson had to maintain his reputation as a trading genius and soon found himself hiding his losses there again. As the losses grew higher and higher, Leeson fabricated cover stories to explain why he needed more cash from London; his sterling reputation protected him from close scrutiny.

The beginning of the end occurred on 16 January 1995, when Leeson placed a short straddle in the Singapore and Tokyo stock exchanges, essentially betting that the Japanese stock market would not move significantly overnight. However, the Great Hanshin earthquake hit early in the morning on 17 January, sending Asian markets, and Leeson's trading positions, into a tailspin. Leeson attempted to recoup his losses by making a series of increasingly risky new trades (using a long-long future arbitrage), this time betting that the Nikkei Stock Average would make a rapid recovery. However, the recovery failed to materialise.

Leeson left a note reading, "I'm sorry" and fled Singapore on 23 February. Losses eventually reached £827 million (US$1.4 billion), twice Barings' available trading capital. After a failed bailout attempt, Barings, which had been the UK's oldest merchant bank, was declared insolvent on 26 February. After fleeing to Malaysia, Thailand and finally Germany, Leeson was arrested in Frankfurt and extradited back to Singapore on 20 November 1995.

Leeson pleaded guilty to two counts of "deceiving the bank's auditors and of cheating the Singapore exchange", including forging documents. District judge Richard Magnus, who convicted Leeson, decided to sentence Leeson to six and a half years in Changi Prison in Singapore.  Leeson was released in July 1999 after serving at least two-thirds of his sentence (4 years and 4 months) for good behaviour, and having been diagnosed with colon cancer, which he survived despite grim forecasts at the time. In 1996, Leeson published an autobiography, Rogue Trader, detailing his acts. A review in the financial columns of The New York Times stated, "This is a dreary book, written by a young man very taken with himself, but it ought to be read by banking managers and auditors everywhere." In 1999, the book was made into a film of the same name starring Ewan McGregor and Anna Friel. The events also form the subject matter of a 1996 television documentary made by Adam Curtis, titled Inside Story Special: £830,000,000 – Nick Leeson and the Fall of the House of Barings.

Later career
In 2003, as a mature student, Leeson completed a BSc in Psychology at Middlesex University, and then married Leona Tormay, an Irish beautician. He is a guest on the after-dinner and keynote speaking circuits, stating in 2019 that "two events a month is enough to keep me in the manner to which I'm accustomed". Leeson still deals in the stock markets, but only with his own money.

Galway United F.C.
Leeson was appointed commercial manager of Galway United F.C. in April 2005, rising to the position of general manager in November 2005. By July 2007 he had become the club's chief executive officer. In February 2011, after the club encountered financial problems, he resigned his position.

Media appearances
In June 2005, Leeson released a new book, Back from the Brink: Coping with Stress. It picks up his story where Rogue Trader left off, including in-depth conversations with psychologist Ivan Tyrrell. In 2013 he appeared in Celebrity Apprentice Ireland on TV3.

In July 2015, Singapore's national daily newspaper The Straits Times published an e-book titled Guilty As Charged: 25 Crimes That Have Shaken Singapore Since 1965, which included the Nick Leeson case as one of the top 25 crimes that shocked the nation since its independence in 1965. The book was borne out of collaboration between the Singapore Police Force and the newspaper itself. The paperback edition of the book was published and first appeared on the bookshelves in late June 2017. The paperback edition first entered the ST bestseller list on 8 August 2017, a month after its publication.

On 5 April 2007, The Guardian reported that KPMG, the liquidators of Barings, had sold a trading jacket thought to have been worn by Leeson while trading on SIMEX in Singapore. The jacket was offered for sale on eBay but it failed to reach its reserve price despite a highest bid of £16,100. It was subsequently sold for £21,000. In October 2007 a similar jacket used by Leeson's team but not thought to have been worn by Leeson himself sold at auction for £4,000.

His name is mentioned in the credits of Rogue Trader together with Barings Bank losses of US$1,400,000,000.

Works

See also
 Chia Teck Leng
 Clarence Hatry
 Speculation in financial markets
 List of trading losses
 Jérôme Kerviel
 Kweku Adoboli
 Toshihide Iguchi
 Galway United
 CITIC Group
 White collar crime

References

External links
 
 
 
 
 
 
 
 

1967 births
1992 crimes in Singapore
Living people
20th-century English criminals
Alumni of Middlesex University
British people imprisoned abroad
English bankers
20th-century English businesspeople
English fraudsters
Fugitive financiers
People from County Galway
People from Watford
Prisoners and detainees of Singapore
Rogue traders
People educated at Parmiter's School, Garston
Galway United F.C.
Irish expatriates in England
Fugitives wanted by Singapore